Manandriana, also called Manandriana Avaradrano, is a rural municipality in Analamanga region, in the  Central Highlands of Madagascar. It belongs to the district of Antananarivo-Avaradrano and its population numbers to 6,506 in 2019.

The economy is based on substantial agriculture.  Rice, corn, peanuts, beans, manioc are the main crops.

Geography
It is situated on the paved provincial road RIP 58A (Madagascar) to Sabotsy Namehana (5km) and the capital Antananarivo.

References

Monographie de la Commune

External links

Populated places in Analamanga